With These Hands is a 1950 documentary film presented in flashbacks directed by Jack Arnold and starring Sam Levene as Alexander Brody; originally created for showing to members of the ILGWU, the film opened June 15, 1950 at the 1100 seat Gotham Theatre. The film was nominated for an Academy Award for Best Documentary Feature.

Cast
 Sam Levene as Alexander Brody
 Arlene Francis as Jenny
 Joseph Wiseman as Deleo
 Louis Sorin as Boss
 Alexander Scourby as Doctor
 Rudy Bond as Business agent
 Alexander Lockwood as Doctor (in 1913)
 Haskell Coffin as Impartial chainman
 Julius Bing as Triangle boss
 Morris Strassberg as Bagel and Lox
 Rolly Bester as Typist
 Gail Gregg as Girl in fire
 Judy Walther as Tess

References

External links

Watch With These Hands at the National Film Preservation Foundation

1950 films
1950 documentary films
1950s English-language films
American documentary films
American black-and-white films
Documentary films about disasters
Films directed by Jack Arnold
Films about the labor movement
Films set in New York City
Triangle Shirtwaist Factory fire
1950s American films